Turning Mecard (a transliteration), released as Mecard in the United States, is a South Korean toyline and media franchise launched in 2014, developed for toy company Sonokong by Choirock (Sonokong's multimedia production arm). The toyline involves a model car that, using a card, transforms into an animal-shaped mecha.

Outside South Korea, it is marketed and distributed by American company Mattel, which formed a partnership with Sonokong and acquired a 12% equity stake in the South Korean company in 2016.

Line-ups

 Turning Mecard (released as Mecard in the United States)
 Turning Mecard W
 Turning Mecard R
 Dino Mecard: a spin-off featuring dinosaur-shaped toys.
 Ghost Mecard
 Sepa Mecard
 Mecard Ball

Media
Television series
 Turning Mecard (2015): The 52-episode animated television series was premiered on 3 February 2015 on KBS2, and concluded on 5 February 2016.
 Turning Mecard W (2016): Season 1 (26 episodes) aired between 19 May and 17 November 2016 on KBS2. It was followed by season 2 (26 episodes) which aired between 2 March and 7 September 2017.
 Turning Mecard R (2017): Part of the franchise's soft reboot, it was produced in 3D computer animation unlike other productions in the franchise. The 26-episode series was aired between 14 September 2017 and 5 April 2018 on KBS2.
 Dino Mecard (2017): The television tie-in to the Dino Mecard spin-off was premiered on 23 November 2017 on KBS1.
 Ghost Mecard (2018): ???.
 Bbasha Mecard (2019): ???.
 Mecard Ball (2021): ???.
Film
  (2017): Taking place between W's season 1 finale and season 2 premiere, the film was released on 18 January 2017. The film ranked as the fifth highest-grossing film in South Korea in its weekend of release. The movie eventually grossed a total of KRW 3.1 billion.
Miniseries
 Turning Mecard W: Mechanimal Go (2016): The 9-part miniseries was aired on Sundays between 25 December 2016 and 19 February 2017 on Tooniverse (a specialty TV channel available on multichannel platforms).
  (2017): Taking place after the finale of Turning Mecard W, the 6-part miniseries was aired on Sundays between 15 October and 19 November 2017 on Tooniverse. Later, it was edited into an abridged, feature-length film which was released in South Korean cinemas on 8 February 2018, and placed in eleventh place in the box office with KRW 120 million.

Outside South Korea
Outside South Korea, Mattel is handling sales and distribution of Turning Mecard, as a result of a partnership deal the American company had with Sonokong in 2016; specifically, Choirock (Sonokong's multimedia production arm) granted a worldwide license of Turning Mecard to Mattel, and Mattel acquired a 12% equity stake in Sonokong, becoming the largest shareholder of the South Korean company.

Prior to the Mattel deal, Lingdong distributed the toyline within Mainland China under license. Later, Lingdong released a similar toyline named Eonster Hunter to replace Turning Mecard in its line-up.

Reception
The toyline became a fad in its native South Korea, helping propel Sonokong's stock price from KRW 2,980 to a peak of KRW 8,750 in 2015. The brand accounted for roughly 80% of the company's record-breaking KRW 125 billion revenue that year. However, by 2017 sales for Mecard toys had slowed significantly.

Criticism and controversy

Similarities with Bakugan

Sonokong was the distributor and license holder of Bakugan toyline and media franchise within South Korea. Japanese writer Atsushi Maekawa worked as the head writer of both Bakugan and Mecard animated series.

Spin Master, a Canadian toy company which co-developed Bakugan with Sega Toys in Japan, launched a series of lawsuits against Choirock and Mattel, alleging that the Mecard toys infringe Spin Master's patents related to the Bakugan toys. Spin Master brought the case against Choirock to a court in Mainland China in 2016, but lost in the first trial, and lost again in the second trial in March 2019.

Separately, Spin Master sued Mattel (which distributes Mecard toys outside South Korea and Mainland China) in the U.S. District Court for the Central District of California over the alleged infringement (which the Canadian company confirmed in a press release published on 25 April 2018). This and other lawsuits filed against Mattel in Canada and Mexico are still ongoing as of January 2019.

Spin Master's legal actions came as Bakugan was given a reboot in 2019, and it follows similar moves made by the Canadian company against Chinese toy manufacturers.

References

External links
  by Mattel
  by Sonokong 

Mattel